The Ministry of Social Affairs of Lebanon is part of the cabinet.

History and functions
The ministry was created in 1993 by Law Number 212 and modified by Law Number 327 and Decree Number 5734. The major function of the ministry is to provide social protection and assistance.

The current minister of Social Affairs is Richard Kouyoumdjian.

Structure
The Ministry of Social Affairs includes the following departments:
Administrative Department (al-Diwan)
Department of Planning and Research
Department of Accounting
Department of Development Services
Department of Disabled persons
Department of Social welfare
Department of Private associations & Institutions
Department of Family Social Services
Department of Handcrafts
Department of Social Development

References

External links
 Ministry of Social Affairs

1993 establishments in Lebanon
Lebanon, Social Affairs
Social Affairs
Lebanon